This list of museums in California is a list of museums, defined for this context as institutions (including nonprofit organizations, government entities, and private businesses) that collect and care for objects of cultural, artistic, scientific, or historical interest and make their collections or related exhibits available for public viewing. Also included are non-profit and university art galleries. Museums that exist only in cyberspace (i.e., virtual museums) are not included.

To use the sortable tables: click on the icons at the top of each column to sort that column in alphabetical order; click again for reverse alphabetical order.

Central Coast and Monterey Bay Area

Includes Monterey, San Benito, San Luis Obispo, Santa Barbara, Santa Cruz and Ventura counties

Inland Empire

Riverside County and San Bernardino County
(includes the Coachella Valley)

Los Angeles County

North Coast

Includes Del Norte, Humboldt, Lake, and Mendocino counties

Orange County

San Diego County

San Francisco Bay Area

Includes Alameda, Contra Costa, Marin, Napa, San Francisco, San Mateo, Santa Clara, Solano, and Sonoma counties

San Joaquin Valley

Includes Fresno, Kern, Kings, Madera, Merced, Joaquin, Stanislaus and Tulare counties

Shasta Cascade

Includes Butte, Lassen, Modoc, Plumas, Shasta, Siskiyou, Tehama and Trinity counties

Elsewhere
The museums below are found in the following counties, which may be split over different regions:

 Gold Country - includes Amador, Calaveras, El Dorado, Mariposa, Nevada, Placer, Sierra and Tuolumne counties.
 High Sierra - includes Amador, El Dorado, Inyo, Mariposa, Mono and Placer counties
 Imperial Valley - Imperial County
 Napa Valley - Napa County
 Sacramento Valley - includes Colusa, Placer, Sacramento, Sutter, Yolo and Yuba counties

Defunct museums
 American Victorian Museum, Nevada City, also known as Teddy Bear Castle Museum, 
 ARCO Center for Visual Art, Los Angeles
 Atascadero Historical Society Museum, closed due to the 2003 San Simeon earthquake, seeking new location 
 Briggs Cunningham Museum, an automotive museum in Costa Mesa, closed in 1986 (website)
 California State Military Museum, Sacramento, closed in 2014
 Carole & Barry Kaye Museum of Miniatures, Los Angeles, closed 2001, collection can be seen online
 Celebrity Lingerie Hall of Fame, Hollywood, operated by Frederick's of Hollywood, museum closed in 2005, displayed sexy Frederick's underwear worn by famous stars, information
 Children's Discovery Museum of North San Diego County, Carlsbad, closed in 2006 
 Copia, Napa, closed in 2008
 Exotic World Burlesque Museum, moved from Helendale to Las Vegas, Nevada
 Forrest Ackerman's Sci-Fi Mansion, Hollywood, science fiction memorabilia, closed in 2003, information
 Fort Roosevelt Natural Science and History Museum, Hanford 
 Guinness World Record Museum, San Francisco location; a museum still exists in Hollywood
 Hays Antique Truck Museum, Woodland, collection moved to Reno, Nevada in 2013,  
 Helen Moe Antique Doll Museum, Paso Robles 
 Hollywood Entertainment Museum, archive of former website, closed in 2006 (website also closed by 2014)
 Hollywood Erotic Museum
 Imaginarium of Nevada County, Nevada City, closed in 2010 
 Kenneth G. Fiske Museum of Musical Instruments, Claremont, located at the Claremont Colleges, collection sold to Musical Instrument Museum in Phoenix 
 Lake Arrowhead Children's Museum, closed in 2006 
 Lechler Museum, Piru, closed in 2000 and contents auctioned  interview with owner
 Max Factor Museum, Los Angeles, closed in 1996, information, museum about Max Factor and movie make-up history; building now houses the Hollywood Museum
 Mingei International Museum, Escondido location closed in June 2010
 Movieland Wax Museum
 Ripley's Believe It or Not!, Buena Park location closed in 2009
 Roy Rogers-Dale Evans Museum, Victorville, moved to Branson, Missouri, official site
 San Diego Computer Museum, holdings gifted to the San Diego State University Library, now web-based only
 Treasure Island Museum, San Francisco, website, closed in 1997 but trying to reopen, interpreted the American experience in the Pacific as lived by the men and women of the U.S. sea services: the Navy, Marine Corps, and Coast Guard

See also

Arboreta in California
Aquaria in California
Botanical gardens in California
Historic landmarks in California
Forts in California
Museums list
Nature Centers in California
Observatories in California
Registered Historic Places in California

References

External links
Museums in the USA: California
Southern California Museums & Historical Sites
California Association of Museums
California Historical Societies and Museums
LA Tourist: Museums
House Museums, Open Air Museums and Ship Museums in Southern California
Things to do in Los Angeles

 *
California
Museums
Museums
Museums